Aurelio De Laurentiis (born 24 May 1949) is an Italian film producer. He owns the film production company company Filmauro and the Italian football club Napoli (of which he is also chairman). 

He is the nephew of film producer Dino De Laurentiis and first-cousin once removed of chef Giada De Laurentiis. 

De Laurentiis serves on the board of directors of the National Italian American Foundation. In 1995, he was a member of the jury at the 19th Moscow International Film Festival.

After Napoli went bankrupt in 2004 and were relegated to the third division of Italian Football, De Laurentiis bought the club with the ambition of bringing them back up the divisions whilst ensuring financial stability. After 2 promotions in 3 years, Napoli were back in Serie A. They spent the first few years in mid-table, and in the 2010–11 season qualified for the UEFA Champions League. Napoli spent the 2010s competing at the top of the table and in European football. The club has yet to win the Serie A under his ownership, coming closest in the 2017–18 Serie A season—finishing second with a club record 91 points, 4 points behind champions Juventus.

Filmography 

La mazzetta (1978)
Amici Miei, Atto II (1982)
Vacanze di Natale (1983)
Maccheroni (1985)
Yuppies, i giovani di successo (1986)
Codice privato (1988)
Leviathan (1989)
Vacanze di Natale '91 (1991)
Where the Night Begins (1991)
Huevos de Oro (1993)
Dichiarazioni- (1994)
L'amico d'infanzia  (1994)
Men, Men, Men (1995)
S.P.Q.R. 2.000 e 1/2 anni fa (1996)
I buchi neri (1995)
Silenzio si nasce (1996)
Festival (1996)
L'arcano incantatore (1996)
A spasso nel tempo (1994)
Vacanze di Natale '95  (1995)
Il testimone dello sposo (1998)
Incontri proibiti (1998)
Matrimoni (1998)
Coppia omicida (1998)
Il cielo in una stanza (1999)
Tifosi Film (1997)
Paparazzi (1998)
Vacanze di Natale 2000 (1999)
Bodyguards (2000)
Amici ahrarara (2001)
Merry Christmas (2001)
Il nostro matrimonio è in crisi (2002)
Natale sul Nilo (2002)
Sky Captain and the World of Tomorrow (2004)
Le barzellette (2004)
Tutto in quella notte (2004)
Christmas in Love (2004)
Che ne sarà di noi (2004)
Christmas in Miami (2005)
Manuale d'amore (2005)
My Best Enemy (2006)
Christmas in NYC (2006)
Manuale d'Amore 2 (2007)
Natale in Crociera (2007)
Grande, grosso e Verdone (2008)
Christmas in Rio (2008)
'Latta e Cafè (2009)Christmas in Beverly Hills (2009)Italians (2009)Genitori & Figli Agitare bene prima dell'uso (2010)Natale in Sudafrica (2010)Manuale d'amore 3 (2011)Amici Miei Come tutto ebbe inizio (2011)Vacanze di Natale a Cortina (2011)Posti in piedi in Paradiso (2012)Colpi di Fulmine (2012)Il terzo tempo (2013)Colpi di Fortuna (2013)Sotto una buona stella (2014)Un Natale Stupefacente (2014)L'abbiamo fatta grossa (2016)Natale a Londra – Dio salvi la regina (2017)Super vacanze di Natale'' (2017)

References

External links 

 
   aurelio

1949 births
Living people
Businesspeople from Rome
Italian film producers
Italian football chairmen and investors
S.S.C. Napoli
David di Donatello winners
Nastro d'Argento winners
People of Campanian descent
S.S.C. Bari
De Laurentiis family